Butrint Imeri (born 3 July 1996) is a Kosovo-Albanian singer and dancer.

Life and career

1996–present: Early life and continued success 

Imeri was born on 3 July 1996 into an Albanian family in the city of Lörrach, Germany. He started dancing at the age of 8 shortly after he enrolled in dance classes in his hometown. Imeri first rose to national fame as he debuted with the singles, "Ki me lyp", "Merre zemrën tem" and "Eja Eja", with whom he received significant recognition in the Albanian-speaking Balkans. He later released four additional singles, including "E jona" and "Delicious", the latter in collaboration with Greek singer of Albanian descent Eleni Foureira, which peaked at number five in Albania. Imeri's chart success followed into 2017 with "Bella" and his first number one single in Albania "Xhanem".

In 2019, Imeri collaborated with Majk on "Sa gjynah" and reached number one in Albania. Another pair of top ten singles in his native country, "Hajt Hajt" and "M'ke rrejt", followed in the same year. "Dream Girl", a collaboration with German rapper Nimo released under 385idéal, was successful, including in Austria, Germany and Switzerland. In 2020, Imeri collaborated with Albanian singer Ermal Fejzullahu on his follow-up single, "Për një Dashuri", which peaked at number two. He further released "Si përpara" and "Dy zemra", the latter in collaboration with Albanian singer Nora Istrefi. The follow-up release, "Phantom", went on to reach number one in Albania.

Artistry 

Imeri's musical work is often defined as R&B and Pop. He has cited Justin Timberlake as his major musical influence and stated that he is a fan of Elvana Gjata.

Discography

Albums 

Acoustic Sessions (2020)

Singles

As lead artist

As featured artist

References

External links 

1996 births
21st-century Albanian male singers
Albanian-language singers
Albanian male dancers
Albanian pop singers
Albanian rhythm and blues singers
Albanian songwriters
German people of Albanian descent
Kosovan singers
Kosovo Albanians
Living people
People from Lörrach
Universal Music Group artists